Sindh cricket team is a domestic cricket team in Pakistan representing Sindh province. It competes in domestic first-class, List A and T20 cricket competitions, namely the Quaid-e-Azam Trophy, Pakistan Cup and National T20 Cup. The team is operated by the Sindh Cricket Association.

History

Before 2019

Sindh played its first first-class game in December 1932, when they drew with Ceylon at the Gymkhana ground in Karachi. On 22 November 1935 Sindh and Australia played a three day match - Figure 1. The match was seen by 5,000 Karachiites. The team played its inaugural season in the Ranji Trophy in 1934. From 1934–35 until 1947–48 Sindh participated in the Ranji Trophy. On 27 December 1947 Sind hosted the first first-class game to be played in Pakistan, but were defeated by an innings and 68 runs by Punjab. The greatest Sindh player in the Ranji Trophy period was Naoomal Jeoomal who played in India's first test match against England at Lord's in 1932. Jeoomal became coach of the Pakistan cricket team in 1960. In Pakistani domestic cricket, Sindh played in the Quaid-e-Azam Trophy each season from 1953–54 to 1956–57, but then made only sporadic appearances at first-class level until the 1970s, when two Sindh teams (Sind A and Sind B) competed in the Quaid-e-Azam Trophy for several years; the province also played List A cricket. Until 2019, Sindh's last first-class match under that name was a seven-wicket loss in January 1979 against Habib Bank Limited.  After that, a "Sind Governor's XI" played three games in the 1980s and one in 2000, while a "Rest of Sindh" team took part in the 2001–02 Quaid-e-Azam Trophy (finishing bottom of Pool A with no wins from eight games) and One Day National Tournament.

Since 2019
The team was introduced as a part of the new domestic structure announced by the Pakistan Cricket Board (PCB) on 31 August 2019.

Structure

As of 2019, domestic cricket in Pakistan was reorganised into six regional teams (on provincial lines). A three tier bottom-up system is in operation with the Tier 1 teams participating in the Quaid-e-Azam Trophy (First Class), Pakistan Cup (List A) and National T20 Cup (Regional T20). The Tier 2 teams participate in the City Cricket Association Tournament whilst the Tier 3 teams participate in various local tournaments as both tiers feed players to the Tier 1 team. 
 Tier 1: Sindh
 Tier 2: Karachi (Zone I), Karachi (Zone II), Karachi (Zone III), Karachi (Zone IV), Karachi (Zone V), Karachi (Zone VI), Karachi (Zone VII), Hyderabad, Jamshoro, Mirpur Khas, Badin, Sanghar, Sukkur, Shikarpur, Khairpur, Larkana & Benazirabad.
 Tier 3: Various Clubs & Schools.

Season summaries

2019/20 Season 
Sindh finished in fifth place in both the Quaid-e-Azam Trophy and National T20 Cup. The Pakistan Cup was cancelled this season due to the covid-19 pandemic.

2020/21 Season 
The team finished in sixth and third place respectively in the Quaid-e-Azam Trophy and the National T20 Cup. Although finishing first in the league phase of the Pakistan Cup, Sindh did was could not progress to the final in the knock-out phase of the tournament.

Current squad
Players with international caps are listed in bold.

See also
 Balochistan cricket team
 Central Punjab cricket team
 Khyber Pakhtunkhwa cricket team
 Northern cricket team
 Southern Punjab cricket team

References 

 Scorecard of the 1947 Sind v Punjab match

Pakistani first-class cricket teams
Cricket Team